The Theodore Sturgeon Memorial Award is an annual literary award presented by the Theodore Sturgeon Literary Trust and the Center for the Study of Science Fiction at the University of Kansas to the author of the best short science fiction story published in English in the preceding calendar year. It is the short fiction counterpart of the John W. Campbell Memorial Award for Best Science Fiction Novel, which was awarded until 2020 by the Center at the same conference. The award is named in honor of Theodore Sturgeon, one of the leading authors of the Golden Age of Science Fiction from 1939 to 1950. The award was established in 1987 by his heirs—including his widow, Jayne Sturgeon—and James Gunn, at the time the Director of the Center for the Study of Science Fiction.

From 1987 through 1994 the award was given out by a panel of science fiction experts led by Orson Scott Card. Beginning in 1995, the committee was replaced by a group of jurors, who vote on the nominations submitted for consideration. The initial jurors were James Gunn, Frederik Pohl, and Judith Merril. Merril was replaced on the jury by former winner Kij Johnson in 1997. One of Sturgeon's children—Noel Sturgeon in most years—was added to the panel in 1999. George Zebrowski served as a jury member from 2005 to 2014.  Elizabeth Bear was added in 2013. Andy Duncan was a juror from 2013 to 2018. Sarah Pinsker was added in 2019, and Taryne Taylor in 2020. The current jury is Elizabeth Bear, Kij Johnson, Sarah Pinsker, Noel Sturgeon, and Taryne Taylor. The current awards administrator is Jason Baltazar.

Nominations are submitted by reviewers, fans, publishers, and editors, and are collated into a list of finalists to be voted on by the jury. The maximum eligible length that a work may be is not formally defined by the center. The award is given in June of each year at the University of Kansas; it was previously presented at the Campbell Conference along with the John W. Campbell Memorial Award, but since 2022 is presented as part of the Sturgeon Symposium. Winners are invited to attend the ceremony. Since 2004 winners have received a personalized trophy, and since the inception of the award a permanent trophy has recorded all of the winners.

During the 36 years the award has been active, 211 authors have had works nominated, 37 of whom have won, including one tie. No author has won more than once. John Kessel has won once out of eight nominations, Michael Swanwick one of seven, Ursula K. Le Guin, Nancy Kress, Ian McDonald, and Ted Chiang one of six, and Paolo Bacigalupi and Lucius Shepard have won once out of four times. Robert Reed has the most nominations without winning at eight, followed by James Patrick Kelly and Ian R. MacLeod at seven, Ken Liu at six, and Greg Egan and Bruce Sterling at five.

Winners and nominees
In the following table, the years correspond to the date of the ceremony, rather than when the work was first published. Each year links to the corresponding "year in literature". Entries with a blue background and an asterisk (*) next to the writer's name have won the award; those with a white background are the other nominees on the shortlist.

  *   Winners

References

External links
 

1987 establishments in Kansas
S
Awards established in 1987
Lists of speculative fiction-related award winners and nominees
Science fiction awards
Short story awards
University of Kansas